The 1911–12 Mississippi A&M Bulldogs basketball team represented Mississippi A&M College in the 1911–12 college basketball season.

References

Mississippi AandM
Mississippi State Bulldogs men's basketball seasons